Udea caminopis is a moth of the family Crambidae. It is endemic to the Hawaiian islands of Oahu, Molokai and Hawaii.

The larvae feed on Labordea species.

External links

Moths described in 1899
Endemic moths of Hawaii
caminopis